Lozotaenia exomilana is a species of moth of the family Tortricidae. It is found in the United States, where it has been recorded from North Carolina and Virginia.

The wingspan is 11–13 mm. The forewings are pale grey brown with white along the costa and outer fourth of the wing. There is a pattern of brownish-black transverse lines. The hindwings are pale fuscous grey, but darker at the apex and along the outer and inner margins. Adults have been recorded on wing from June to July.

References

	

Moths described in 1986
Archipini